Usnea florida is a species of beard lichen in the family Parmeliaceae. It was first described by Carl Linnaeus in his 1753 work Species Plantarum. German botanist Friedrich Heinrich Wiggers transferred it to the genus Usnea in 1780. It is considered a threatened or vulnerable species in several European countries.

References

florida
Lichen species
Lichens described in 1753
Lichens of Europe
Taxa named by Carl Linnaeus